The FIL World Luge Championships 1987 took place in Igls, Austria for the second time, having done so previously in 1977.

Men's singles

Prock wins Austria's first medal at the world championships since 1978.

Women's singles

Men's doubles

Hoffman and Pietszch become the first lugers to win three straight World Championship events.

Medal table

References
Men's doubles World Champions
Men's singles World Champions
Women's singles World Champions

FIL World Luge Championships
1987 in luge
1987 in Austrian sport
Luge in Austria